The Ascot Water Playground is a former recreation facility in Ascot, Western Australia. Built in 1975 under the Labor government's Red Scheme for the long-term unemployed, it was officially opened in November 1977 at a cost of $326,156. The complex had pools, water slides, and mini-golf. The park closed in 2002 because of new occupational health and safety laws, as well as river run-off laws.

It was added to the Municipal Heritage Inventory in 2003.

References 

Buildings and structures in Perth, Western Australia
Ascot, Western Australia